The Minerva is a cruise ship built in 1989, and originally intended as a Soviet research vessel, the Okean.  The deal to purchase her fell through and Swan Hellenic (at the time a subsidiary of P&O Cruises) purchased her in 1996 and renamed her Minerva.

History
She sailed with Swan Hellenic until her lease ran out in 2003.  She briefly sailed with Saga Cruises as the Saga Pearl, and was then chartered to Abercrombie & Kent as the Explorer II, making voyages to Antarctica and South America from December to April with up to 198 passengers. From May to November, she sailed for the German-owned travel company Phoenix Reisen as the Alexander von Humboldt.

In July 2007 it was announced that the ship had been acquired by the relaunched Swan Hellenic line and the name would revert to Minerva. In early 2012, Minerva received a multi-million-pound, 83-day refit.

In January 2017, Swan Hellenic went into administration and cancelled cruises on Minerva until further notice.

Gallery

References

Bibliography

External links

Pictures of MV Minerva including visit to Dartmouth, Devon 11 July 2010
"Swanning Around The Mediterranean" – review by Peter Newall in Maritime Matters of a Mediterranean cruise aboard MV Minerva

Cruise ships
Ships built in Italy
Ships built by T. Mariotti
1989 ships
Ships built at Okean Shipyard
Ships built in the Soviet Union